Luke Vincent Conlan (born 31 October 1994) is a Northern Irish professional footballer who plays as a defender for AFC Fylde.

Club career
Born in Portaferry, County Down, Conlan attended St Columba's School in the town and played for junior clubs Grosvenor Youth and Portaferry. He was recruited by Championship side Burnley in the summer of 2011, signing a two-year scholarship with the club. He was a key member of the youth side that reached the 2011–12 FA Youth Cup semi-finals, eventually losing 3–1 to Blackburn Rovers on aggregate.

In March 2012, whilst still a first-year apprentice, Conlan signed his first professional contract in a two-year deal. He remained a regular in the youth and reserve sides until he suffered a knee injury, and in April 2014 it was announced by Burnley that he would not be retained at the end of the season when his contract expired. However, he continued to train with the club during pre-season and in September 2014, after recovering from injury, he signed a one-year contract extension with the club. In April 2015, it was announced that Conlan had signed another one-year contract extension until the summer of 2016.

In July 2015 he signed for Scottish Championship side St Mirren on a season-long loan deal. He made his debut for the club in the 3–1 Scottish Challenge Cup victory over Berwick Rangers. Conlan received his first senior red card in the Renfrewshire derby against Greenock Morton on 21 August 2015. The match ended 0–0. Conlan returned to Burnley in January 2016, having failed to break into the St Mirren first team. In January 2016, he was sent on a one-month youth loan to Football League Two side Morecambe.

In June 2019 he signed a new contract with Morecambe. He scored his first professional goal for Morecambe when he scored in an EFL Trophy tie against Carlisle United on 12 November 2019.

In September 2020 he signed for AFC Fylde.

International career
Conlan has been capped at under-16, under-17, under-19 and under-21 level for Northern Ireland.

Career statistics

References

External links

1997 births
Living people
People from Portaferry
Association footballers from Northern Ireland
Northern Ireland youth international footballers
Northern Ireland under-21 international footballers
Burnley F.C. players
St Mirren F.C. players
Morecambe F.C. players
AFC Fylde players
Scottish Professional Football League players
English Football League players
National League (English football) players
Association football defenders